Chloroclystis alpnista is a moth in the family Geometridae. It is found in Australia (Queensland). Subspecies eupora was described from Bali.

Subspecies
Chloroclystis alpnista alpnista (Queensland)
Chloroclystis alpnista eupora Prout, 1958 (Bali)

References

External links

Moths described in 1907
alpnista
Moths of Australia
Moths of Indonesia